In Operation Doomsday, the British 1st Airborne Division acted as a police and military force during the Allied occupation of Norway in May 1945, immediately after the victory in Europe during the Second World War.  The division maintained law and order until the arrival of the remainder of Force 134, the occupation force. During its time in Norway, the division was tasked with supervising the surrender of the German forces in Norway, as well as preventing the sabotage of vital military and civilian facilities.

The German Instrument of Surrender was delivered on 8 May to General Franz Böhme, the commander of all German forces stationed in Norway, and the 1st Airborne Division landed near Oslo and Stavanger between 9 May and 11 May. The majority of the transport aircraft carrying the division landed safely, but three planes crashed with a number of fatalities. The division encountered little of the expected German resistance. Operational duties included welcoming back King Haakon VII of Norway, looking after Allied ex-prisoners of war, arresting war criminals and supervising the clearing of minefields. The division was also able to confirm the deaths of the British airborne troops that had taken part in Operation Freshman, an unsuccessful attempt to disrupt the German atomic weapons programme in November 1942. The division returned to Britain at the end of August and disbanded two months later.

Background
Since 1943 the Western Allies had been developing plans for the occupation of Norway, code-named Operation Apostle, after Germany's surrender. Force 134, the occupation force, was composed of Norwegian troops who were stationed in Scotland, as well as a British contingent (initially the 52nd (Lowland) Infantry Division), a few American troops, and some 12,000 Norwegian police troops stationed in neutral Sweden. In the event of an emergency, the Supreme Headquarters Allied Expeditionary Force would deploy troops into Norway from Germany.

The operation came under Headquarters Scottish Command, which had been commanded by General Andrew Thorne since 7 May 1941. One of the reasons behind Thorne's appointment to Scottish Command, was a belief in British military circles that Adolf Hitler held Thorne in high regard. Thorne had met Hitler while serving as British Military Attaché in Berlin (1934–1935).  Following British Commando raids in Norway during 1941, Hitler had ordered substantial reinforcements for Norway, and British high command hoped that the appointment Thorne as head of Scottish Command would "focus the Fuhrer's attention on the threat [that the Allies] posed to [Axis forces] in  Scandinavia." Thorne, however, reportedly regarded his post as "being banished to Scotland",

Two separate scenarios were considered in planning for Operation Apostle. The first, known as 'Rankin C (Norway)' was based on the assumption that all German forces occupying Norway would surrender as part of a more general unconditional surrender by Germany. The second was known as 'Rankin B' and assumed that there was no surrender and that only parts of Norway would be abandoned by the Germans in order to reinforce their troops stationed in north-western Europe against Allied advances there; in this scenario, Force 134 would encounter heavy German resistance. The development of plans for the liberation and administration of Norway were complicated by it being difficult to predict whether the landings would be opposed by German forces and the extent of damage resulting from Allied bombardments and any German "scorched earth" demolitions. As a result, planning for the administration of Norway was detailed and flexible.

Either of the two 'Rankin' scenarios would be difficult for Thorne to accomplish however, as the troops allocated to Force 134 were meagre; from late 1943 onwards the majority of military resources were dedicated to the campaign in north-west Europe. In September 1944 Thorne was even deprived of 52nd Lowland Division, which was attached to the 1st Allied Airborne Army by the War Office and earmarked for Operation Market Garden. Instead Thorne was later given the 1st Airborne Division, under the command of Major General Roy Urquhart. However, owing to the heavy casualties the division had suffered during Market Garden it would not be combat ready until 1 May 1945 after being heavily reinforced. In order to bolster his forces, Thorne would therefore have to rely on Milorg, the Norwegian Resistance. The Allied civil affairs planners maintained very close contact with the Norwegian Government in exile which was based in London as well as Milorg. As a result, by the end of the war Milorg had been preparing for the arrival of an Allied force for some time; its 40,000 members were well-armed and trained, and led by more than 100 Special Operations Executive agents parachuted into Norway, and it was prepared to prevent any sabotage of key communication centres and other important facilities by German troops if they resisted the Allied forces.

Prelude

Allied preparations
By early May 1945, 1st Airborne Division had been brought up to strength, albeit mainly with inexperienced replacements. 4th Parachute Brigade had been disbanded and its battalions merged with those of 1st Parachute Brigade in the aftermath of the Battle of Arnhem. It was replaced by 1st Independent Polish Parachute Brigade. The Norwegian Parachute Company was also attached to the 1st Airborne Division. However, on 4 May, Urquhart was ordered to despatch 1st Independent Polish Brigade to Dunkirk, and to detach 1st Parachute Brigade from the division; one of the brigade's battalions would immediately be transported to Denmark for occupation duties, with the rest of the Brigade remaining in Britain as a reserve formation. At the same time the rest of the division was warned that it would soon be transported by air to Norway as part of the occupation force, with the Special Air Service Brigade being temporarily attached to the division to replace 1st Parachute Brigade. Urquhart informed Thorne that the division could be ready for deployment in 48 hours, far less time than Thorne and his staff had expected. When it entered Norway, the division would be responsible for maintaining law and order in the areas it occupied, ensuring that German units followed the terms of their surrender, securing and then protecting captured airfields, and finally preventing the sabotage of essential military and civilian structures. To achieve this, the division would be formed of three brigades: 1st Airlanding Brigade, Special Air Service Brigade and an ad hoc Artillery Brigade formed from divisional troops.

1st Airlanding Brigade would land near to the Norwegian capital, Oslo, and occupy the city alongside other elements of Force 134.  The brigade's commander, Brigadier R. H. Bower, would become Commander, Oslo area for the duration of the division's time in Norway. Oslo was chosen because it was the Norwegian capital, as well as being the centre of Norwegian and German administration. Similarly, the Artillery Brigade would land at Stavanger and its commanding officer Brigadier R.G. Loder-Symonds would become Commander, Stavanger area. Stavanger was the closest airfield to Britain, and would also be useful as a fighter base. Finally, Special Air Service Brigade would also land in Stavanger, from where it would advance to and occupy the area around Kristiansand. This was an important port from which the Royal Navy would sweep the surrounding waters for mines. The division's operations would be divided into four phases over four consecutive days. On 8 May, fifteen transport aircraft would carry advance parties to airfields at Gardermoen, near Oslo, and Sola airfield by Stavanger; this was to be completed by the evening. The second phase, on 9 May, would see seventy Handley Page Halifaxes transport 1st Airlanding Brigade and elements of Headquarters 1st Airborne Division to both airfields, and another seventy-six C-47 Dakotas land the Artillery Brigade at Sola. On 10 May, the third phase would see Special Air Service Brigade land at Sola, and finally stores and vehicles would be landed at both airfields on 11 May. Before the division began to land in Norway, specially selected Allied representatives known as 'Heralds' would accompany German diplomatic delegates to Norway; only when they signaled that the airfields were clear to land on would the first transport aircraft take off from Britain.

Axis preparations
German forces had started gradual withdrawal to northernmost Finland in early September 1944 in Operation Birke. As the value of Petsamo region had decreased, the Germans decided in early October 1944 to abandon Finland and most of northern Norway and had begun Operation Nordlicht (Northern Light), a retreat into prepared positions at Lyngen in northern Norway. Operation Nordlicht had come to an end at the beginning of January 1945, with only a few miles of Finnish territory remaining in German hands, and several isolated garrisons in Norwegian Finnmark. Soviet forces occupied eastern Finnmark, and the Soviets asked for Western Allied forces to be landed to support them. Only a single company of Norwegian mountain infantry could be spared for that duty though the British and the Norwegian governments provided food supplies for the civilian population in the area. Due to the failure of the recent offensive in the Ardennes and the fact that several new types of U-boat were ready to be deployed, the German positions in Norway became of great value to Grand Admiral Karl Dönitz, Commander-in-Chief of the Naval High Command as a way to continue submarine warfare against the Allies. They also were to Adolf Hitler, who denied requests from General Heinz Guderian for be withdrawn from Norway for use in the defence of Germany and from Böhme in March for northern Norway to be abandoned and construction of submarine pens to end for lack of materials. He feared that any withdrawal might tempt neutral Sweden to enter the war in support of the Allies and that any withdrawal from northern Norway would endanger U-boat bases in the southern parts of the country. Until the last days of the war, Dönitz believed that Norway should be kept to deploy submarines against Allied vessels, and on 3 May, the Kriegsmarine Naval Warfare Command informed U-boat staff that even if Germany itself were occupied, submarines would still sail from Norway. Only on 4 May were orders issued by the Oberkommando der Wehrmacht for all German troops in Norway to avoid actions that might provoke Allied forces.

In May 1945, all German troops in Norway came under the command of the Twentieth Mountain Army, which had absorbed the Army Norway on 18 December 1944. It was commanded by General Franz Böhme, who had succeeded General Lothar Rendulic as Armed Forces Commander, Norway in January 1945. At the beginning of May, Böhme informed Grand Admiral Karl Dönitz, Commander-in-Chief of the Naval High Command and the new German President, with the death of Adolf Hitler, that all forces in Norway consisted of eleven divisions and five brigades. In total, they had a combined strength of between 350,000 and 380,000 troops. There were also a number of U-boats stationed in naval bases in Norway, including 10 Mark XXI and 17 Mark XXIII models. Yet although Allied forces had entered Germany, and rumours and speculation were rife about a possible invasion of Norway, the Twentieth Mountain Army almost seemed to be at a peace-time status. Böhme had complained in January that there were some units in the Army that took Sunday off as a holiday and that he could do little to stop it. With only some 30,000 Allied troops on hand, the surrender of Norway to Allied forces was not immediately accepted by General Montgomery, and would instead be accomplished through preliminary persuasion and negotiation from Sir Andrew Thorne.

Occupation

Arrival
In the early hours of 7 May, Dönitz gave the order for all German military forces to unconditionally surrender, and on 8 May the German Instrument of Surrender was delivered to General Böhme. The Germans were to withdraw from all Norwegian towns and the Swedish border and gradually redeploy to areas pre-designated for disarmament; simultaneously, all senior Nazi party officials and security personnel were to immediately be arrested. Force 134 would be greatly outnumbered during its task; a total of 30,000 Allied troops would have to supervise the disarmament of more than 350,000 German troops. There were fears that the German forces might refuse to surrender and instead resist the Allied occupation forces, and there were particular concerns about what the large detachment of Kriegsmarine personnel at the port of Trondheim might do.

Although the first phase of the operation had been scheduled for 8 May, no word was received from the 'Heralds' and so Doomsday was postponed by twenty-four hours. Contact was successfully established on 9 May and the first units of Force 134 arrived in Norway to begin their occupation, including the first elements of 1st Airborne Division and the Norwegian Parachute Company. All but one of the transport aircraft belonging to the first phase took off and landed in Norway without incident. Phase II was accelerated to compensate for the delay, with aircraft scheduled to leave Britain between 02:00 and 13:30. Unfortunately, after approximately 07:00 poor weather over Oslo caused many transport aircraft heading for the airfield there to return to Britain, although all of those destined for Stavanger landed successfully. Several crash-landed, and one was reported missing. The remaining aircraft took off again on 11 May, with one crashing on takeoff and another going missing; of the two missing aircraft, one landed at another airfield in Norway, but the other had crashed killing all of its occupants, including Air Vice-Marshal Scarlett-Streatfeild. The aircraft belonging to the next two phases suffered no more casualties, although a number of them were again delayed by inclement weather over the Norwegian airfields. 1st Airborne Division suffered one officer and thirty-three other ranks killed, and one other rank wounded, and the Royal Air Force six killed and seven injured. All of these losses had occurred after the general surrender had been declared.

Occupation duties

The original plan for the division called for two of the airborne battalions to march through Oslo on 10 May, but the delay meant that only a few troops had arrived by this date. Instead, two platoons from 2nd Battalion The South Staffordshire Regiment and four Military Policemen on motorcycles accompanied Urquhart, who rode in a commandeered German staff car. The soldiers, although somewhat nervous given the small size of their group, were greeted enthusiastically by the Norwegian population in Oslo. The only resistance came from the captains of several U-boats at Trondheim. Apart from this, 1st Airborne Division encountered no trouble from the German forces in Norway, who co-operated fully with the airborne troops. They were disarmed without problem, allowed themselves to be transferred to collection camps and also assisted in the clearing of numerous minefields they had sown during their occupation, which resulted in several German casualties.

Until the arrival of other units from Force 134, as well as the Headquarters of Allied Forces, Norway, Major General Urquhart and his headquarters staff had complete control over all Norwegian activities. This meant that it was Urquhart who welcomed Crown Prince Olaf of Norway and three ministers representing the Norwegian Government when they arrived on a Royal Navy cruiser, and the division also took part in the celebrations when King Haakon VII of Norway returned to his country from exile. Other duties for the division included rounding up war criminals, ensuring that German troops were confined to their camps and reservations and, with Royal Engineer assistance, clearing buildings of mines and other boobytraps. They were also given the responsibility of assisting Allied personnel who had, until the German surrender, been prisoners of war in Norway, a large number of whom were Russian. There were more than 80,000 Russian ex-prisoners of war, and many needed medical treatment because of the inhumane conditions of the camps in which they had been imprisoned. When a parade was held in late June to celebrate the Allied liberation, many of the Russians participated, wearing uniforms with Red Star badges they had made themselves. During the division's time in Norway, some 400 paratroopers under the command of Major Frederick Gough were temporarily transferred to the Netherlands, where they helped take part in Theirs Is the Glory, a documentary about the Battle of Arnhem.

The Norwegian resistance co-operated fully with 1st Airborne Division, often providing liaisons and performing guard duties, and the Norwegian population as a whole gave a warm welcome to the airborne troops. British forces were initially only in control of Oslo, Stavanger and Kristiansand with the resistance and, less commonly, local Norwegian authorities taking control of the rest of the country from the Germans. The resistance also helped the division discover the fate of 1st Airborne Division troops assigned to Operation Freshman, a failed attempt in November 1942 to sabotage the Norsk Hydro chemical plant at Vemork, which produced heavy water for Nazi Germany's atomic weapons programme. Two gliders had been assigned to the operation, and both had crash-landed after being released by the aircraft towing them. The men who survived the crashes were executed shortly after being captured. Although the local Norwegian population could not prevent the prisoners being executed, they later recovered their remains and reinterred them in marked graves. When it arrived, 1st Airborne Division was informed of the fate of the operation and cooperated with the Norwegian government to have a memorial erected and the fallen men buried with full military honours at Stavanger and Oslo.

Aftermath

The remaining units of Force 134 entered Norway throughout the rest of May, gradually reinforcing the airborne troops. On 10 May elements of the 12,000 strong Norwegian police force began to enter the country from Sweden, having been raised from young Norwegians who had fled to Sweden after Norway had been occupied in 1940. General Thorne arrived with the rest of his headquarters on 13 May, and took up his position as Commander-in-Chief Allied Liberation Forces. In the next two weeks further elements of Force 134 arrived, including a composite American regiment, a Norwegian brigade, and two British infantry brigades composed of re-trained anti-aircraft gunners who replaced the Special Air Service Brigade. Thorne was the de facto Head of Government of Norway until 7 June, when King Haakon returned, and from then until his departure at the end of October was Commander-in-Chief of all military forces in Norway.

1st Airborne Division was stationed in Norway until the end of the summer. It returned to Britain at the end of August, and its personnel were sent on leave. Initial plans had called for the division to be used as an Imperial Strategic Reserve, as it was believed that 6th Airborne Division would be required in the Far Eastern Theatre; however, when Japan surrendered in August it negated the need for 6th Airborne Division to be transferred. This created a problem, as two airborne divisions existed, but only one was included in the planned post-war British Regular Army. Although the tradition of seniority might have called for 6th Airborne Division to be disbanded as the junior airborne formation, 1st Airborne Division was still understrength after Operation Market Garden and not fully trained. As such, the division spent the next two months training and transferring troops to 6th Airborne Division, and then disbanded on 15 November 1945.

Notes

References

 
 
 
 
 
 
 
 
 
 
 

Conflicts in 1945
1945 in Norway
Doomsday
Doomsday
Doomsday
Doomsday
Doomsday